Bangladesh House Building Finance Corporation (BHBFC) is a specialized public financial institution that finances the construction and renovation of houses and purchasing residential apartments in all over Bangladesh and its headquarter is located in 22 Purana  Paltan, Dhaka.

History
The institution was set up in 1973 under presidential orders. It gives loans for only individual home construction and has faced criticism for giving loans mostly to government employees. It is headquartered in a 10-storey building in Paltan, Dhaka. In 2013 Hefazat-e-Islam Bangladesh tried to burn down the institutions headquarters and vandalized 12 cars.

Managing director 
MANNAN is the current managing director of Bangladesh House Building Finance Corporation. Managing director is the chief executive and on behalf of the board, directs and controls the whole affairs of the corporation.

Offices 
Apart from its headquarter Bangladesh House Building finance Corporation has a total of 84 offices including 10  Zonal office and 14 Regional Office. The following are where the branches for Bangladesh House Building finance Corporation Zonal Offices are located

 Dhaka North
 Dhaka South
 Chattogram
 Khulna 
 Rajshahi
 Barisal
 Sylhet
 Rangpur
 Mymensingh
 Faridpur
 Jashore

References

1973 establishments in Bangladesh
Government-owned companies of Bangladesh
Organisations based in Paltan
Housing finance companies of Bangladesh